Ramsey Windmill may refer to the following windmills:

Ramsey Windmill, Cambridgeshire, England
Ramsey Windmill, Essex, England
Lezayre Mill, Ramsey, Isle of Man